Re-Invention is the second album of the reggae punk band Too Rude, released on 26 October 2004. This album follows the debut self-titled album Too Rude, released on 4 April 2000.

Track listing

External links
 Too Rude Official Myspace
 Re-Invention
 Re-Invention Myspace

References

2004 albums
Suburban Noize Records albums